Ein Mann am Zug is a German television series. After the 90-minute pilot film was broadcast on September 20, 1993, the remaining 15 episodes were broadcast weekly on ZDF from September 23, 1993 to December 30, 1993.

See also
List of German television series

References

External links
 

1993 German television series debuts
1993 German television series endings
German-language television shows
Television shows set in Hamburg
ZDF original programming